Jean Pessina is a Swiss retired slalom canoeist who competed from the late 1950s to the mid-1960s. He won three medals in the C-2 team event at the ICF Canoe Slalom World Championships with a silver (1957) and two bronzes (C-2 team: 1959, 1961).

References

Swiss male canoeists
Possibly living people
Year of birth missing (living people)
Medalists at the ICF Canoe Slalom World Championships